The 1928–29 Rugby Union County Championship was the 36th edition of England's premier rugby union club competition at the time. 

Middlesex won the competition for the first time after defeating Lancashire in the final replay following a drawn match in the first match.

Final

Final Replay

See also
 English rugby union system
 Rugby union in England

References

Rugby Union County Championship
County Championship (rugby union) seasons